The Tivoli Theatre is a three-screen movie theater located in the Delmar Loop area of University City, Missouri, US. It opened on May 24, 1924, as a large, single screen theater with streetcar service in the middle of Delmar Boulevard bringing people to the theater from nearby residential neighborhoods. The theater remained open for many years, but went into decline until it was closed in 1994.

A renovation was started by Joe Edwards and his wife Linda and the theater re-opened on May 19, 1995. Renovation expenses exceeding $2 million attempted to restore the theater to its 1924 splendor.

The Tivoli Theatre shows predominantly independent, documentary and foreign language films, what are commonly referred to as art films, that is made primarily to show the craft of filmmaking or the art of storytelling while entertaining or informing. It occasionally shows cult films, especially at late night showings. The Tivoli is affiliated with the Landmark Theatres chain of film distribution.

The interior of the theater displays a variety of old Hollywood movie posters and memorabilia, specifically focusing on films that involve St. Louis in some way (such as being shot or set there, or stories about famous people from the area).

See also
 Loop Trolley, which opened in 2018 and passes the theatre

References

Buildings and structures in St. Louis County, Missouri
Cinemas and movie theaters in Missouri
Tourist attractions in St. Louis County, Missouri
Tourist attractions in St. Louis
1924 establishments in Missouri